S60 may refer to:

Automobiles 
 S-60 (tractor), a Soviet tractor
 Toyota Crown (S60), a sedan
 Volvo S60, a compact executive car

Aviation 
 Blériot-SPAD S.60, a French biplane fighter
 Kenmore Air Harbor, in Kenmore, Washington, United States
 Sikorsky S-60, a prototype American flying crane

Consumer electronics 
 S60 (software platform), for mobile devices
 Canon PowerShot S60, a digital camera
 Cat S60, a mobile phone
 Pentax Optio S60, a digital camera

Rail and transit 
 S60 (Long Island bus)
 S60 (RER Fribourg), a rail line in Fribourg, Switzerland
 Lugano–Ponte Tresa Railway, in Ticino, Switzerland
 S60, a line of the Stuttgart S-Bahn

Other uses 
 AZP S-60, a Soviet anti-aircraft gun
 , a submarine of the Indian Navy
 S60: This material and its container must be disposed of as hazardous waste, a safety phrase
 S60-class submarine, of the Spanish Navy
 S60 Shangqiu–Dengfeng Expressway, in China
 S60, a postcode district Rotherham, England